Amphitrite (minor planet designation: 29 Amphitrite) is one of the largest S-type asteroids, approximately  in diameter, and probably fifth largest after Eunomia, Juno, Iris and Herculina.

Discovery 
Amphitrite was discovered by Albert Marth on 1 March 1854, at the private South Villa Observatory, in Regent's Park, London. It was Marth's only asteroid discovery. Its name was chosen by George Bishop, the owner of the observatory, who named it after Amphitrite, a sea goddess in Greek mythology.

Characteristics 

Amphitrite's orbit is less eccentric and inclined than those of its larger cousins; indeed, it is the most circular of any asteroid discovered up to that point. As a consequence, it never becomes as bright as Iris or Hebe, especially as it is much further from the Sun than those asteroids. It can reach magnitudes of around +8.6 at a favorable opposition, but usually is around the binocular limit of +9.5.

In 2007, James Baer and Steven R. Chesley estimated Amphitrite to have a mass of 1.9 kg. A more recent estimate by Baer suggests it has a mass of 1.18 kg.

A satellite of the asteroid is suspected to exist, based on lightcurve data collected by Edward F. Tedesco. In 1988 a search for satellites or dust orbiting this asteroid was performed using the UH88 telescope at the Mauna Kea Observatories, but neither were found.

References

External links
 Discovery Circumstances: Numbered Minor Planets (1)-(5000) – Minor Planet Center
 
 

000029
Discoveries by Albert Marth
Named minor planets
000029
000029
18540301